Shiraj Mahalleh-ye Bozorg (also Romanized as Shīraj Maḩalleh-ye Bozorg) is a village in Baladeh Rural District, Khorramabad District, Tonekabon County, Mazandaran Province, Iran. At the 2006 census, its population was 372, in 113 families.

References 

Populated places in Tonekabon County